The Music of Birmingham may refer to:

Classical music of Birmingham
Jazz of Birmingham
Popular music of Birmingham